Figaro Tseng (born 18 November 1981) is a Taiwanese actor, singer and art painter. He was part of Taiwanese boy band Comic Boyz from 2002 to 2005. They released three albums: Hey Hah!! Comic Boyz (2002); Youth Memoir (2003); Goodbye (New + Best Selection) (2005). He has also acted in Taiwanese dramas and hosted television shows.

Early life 
On 18 November 1981, Tseng was born in Zihguan District, Kaohsiung City. He has a younger brother.

When he was in the kindergarten, he suffered a severe accident. As a result, he is totally deaf in his right ear.

Career 
He was part of Taiwanese boy band Comic Boyz from 2002 to 2005. They released three albums: Hey Hah!! Comic Boyz (2002); Youth Memoir (2003); Goodbye (New + Best Selection) (2005). They disbanded in 2005.

Tseng later became a solo actor, host and painter.

Filmography

Television series

Film 
 Oh, Pretty Woman (2018)
 Undercover Carp (2019)

Music video appearances
 "知道" (I Know) – A-mei
 "求救專線" (Hotline For Help) from Make A Wish – Vic Chou 
 "C大調" (C Major) from Flower in the Wonderland – Angela Chang

Discography

Comic Boyz albums

Awards and nominations

See also
Taiwanese art

References

External links

 

1981 births
Living people
Taiwanese Mandopop singers
Taiwanese male television actors
Taiwanese painters
Male actors from Kaohsiung
Musicians from Kaohsiung
Artists from Kaohsiung
21st-century Taiwanese singers